Hear in the Now Frontier is the sixth studio album by the American heavy metal band Queensrÿche, released in 1997. It was partly recorded at Studio Litho in Seattle, the home studio of Pearl Jam guitarist Stone Gossard, and was engineered and mixed by Toby Wright, who had recently worked with Alice In Chains.

The album debuted at No. 19 but quickly vanished from the charts. Hear in the Now Frontier features a more basic, stripped down musical style than anything the band had released to date. Many listeners criticized the band's shift to a more mainstream sound.

Despite the reaction, the singles "Sign of the Times" and "You" received substantial airplay. Both tracks, as well as "Some People Fly," would later be featured on best-of compilations. Sign of the Times: The Best of Queensrÿche, a 2007 compilation, also takes its name from the song. 

The song "All I Want" features guitarist Chris DeGarmo on lead vocals, the only time to date that any band member besides the incumbent lead vocalist has done so on a studio track. After the album's release, DeGarmo left the band.

Tour
During Queensrÿche's tour in support of Hear in the Now Frontier, their longtime label, EMI Records USA, went bankrupt and was merged into Virgin Records America. Queensrÿche was forced to use their own money to finance the remainder of the tour, during which founding member Chris DeGarmo announced he was leaving the band.

DeGarmo would return to play and co-write five songs for Tribe in 2003, but did not officially rejoin.

The band played only half the album on its 1997 tour, with five songs still unplayed as of 2021: "Cuckoo's Nest", "Hero", "Miles Away", "All I Want" and "sp00L". However, "sp00L" and "Hero" have been played by Geoff Tate's band during his 2002 tour to supporting his solo album.

The tour setlist also included "The Lady Wore Black", "Take Hold of the Flame", "Revolution Calling", "The Mission", "I Don't Believe in Love", "Breaking the Silence", "Spreading the Disease", "Eyes of a Stranger", "Empire", "Jet City Woman", "Silent Lucidity", "Another Rainy Night", "I Am I", "Damaged", and "Bridge". "Walk in the Shadows", and "Della Brown" were played a few times as well.

This was the last tour that Queensryche's popularity level allowed them to play large venues and amphitheaters.

Track listing

Personnel
Queensrÿche
Geoff Tate – lead vocals
Michael Wilton – lead guitar
Chris DeGarmo – rhythm guitar, backing vocals, lead vocals on "All I Want"
Eddie Jackson – bass, backing vocals
Scott Rockenfield – drums

Additional personnel
Matt Rollings - keyboards, piano on "All I Want" 
Steve Nathan - keyboards
David Ragsdale - violin on "Sign of the Times"

Production
Peter Collins - production
Toby Wright - engineering, mixing
Adam Atley - assistant engineering
Matt Bayles - assistant engineering
Steve Marcussen - mastering
Hugh Syme - art direction, design
Dimo Safari - art direction, design

Charts

References

1997 albums
Queensrÿche albums
EMI Records albums
Albums produced by Peter Collins (record producer)